Deon Scholtz (born 12 September 1985) is a South African rugby union footballer. He plays mostly as a winger. He most recently represented the Pumas in the Currie Cup and Vodacom Cup. He has previously played for the Boland Cavaliers and Leopards.

External links

itsrugby.co.uk profile

Living people
1985 births
South African rugby union players
Rugby union wings
Pumas (Currie Cup) players
Leopards (rugby union) players
People from Ceres, Western Cape
Rugby union players from the Western Cape